South-Western Administrative Okrug, or Yugo-Zapadny Administrative Okrug, is one of the twelve high-level territorial divisions (administrative okrugs) of the federal city of Moscow, Russia. As of the 2010 Census, its population was 1,362,751, up from 1,179,211 recorded during the 2002 Census.

Territorial divisions
The administrative okrug comprises the following twelve districts:
Akademichesky
Gagarinsky
Zyuzino
Konkovo
Kotlovka
Lomonosovsky
Obruchevsky
Severnoye Butovo
Tyoply Stan
Cheryomushki
Yuzhnoye Butovo
Yasenevo

Economy
Gazprom and the airline Aero Rent have their head offices in the administrative okrug's Cheryomushki District. Head office of RusHydro is in Obruchevsky District.

Education

The Moscow Finnish School, the Japanese School in Moscow, the Swedish School in Moscow, and the main campus of the Scuola Italiana Italo Calvino (Italian school) occupy a single campus in Lomonosovsky District.

Hinkson Christian Academy is also in the district.

References

Notes

Sources

 
Administrative okrugs of Moscow